The Fifth Horseman Is Fear is a 1965 Czechoslovak film about the Holocaust that was directed by Zbyněk Brynych. Instead of depicting gas chambers and concentration camps, the film examines the subtler but equally debilitating mental effects of oppression. It gets its name from the story of the Four Horsemen of the Apocalypse written about in the Book of Revelation.

The film uses expressionist cinematography, and its film score is set to discordant piano music.

Plot
Set in Prague during the German occupation of Czechoslovakia, the film follows Dr. Braun, a Jewish doctor forbidden to practice medicine. He instead works for German officials, cataloging confiscated Jewish property. All Braun wants to do is survive, but his pragmatic mentality is challenged when an injured resistance fighter stumbles into his apartment building. A quest for morphine leads Dr. Braun through his tortured city, where fear eats away at the social structure.

Superficially, the city might appear to be normal, but hallucinations, awkward outbursts, and nervous, self-conscious behavior make it clear that society is falling apart. Although images of the Holocaust are never seen, its devastation is understood through an overarching sense of destitution and fear. As Dr. Braun travels through the seedy undergrounds of Prague and back up to his apartment building—where a long winding staircase connects the lives of all his eccentric neighbors—a wide variety of personalities are introduced to the screen, each of whom appears equally as tortured.

With minimal dialogue and a creeping pace, the sense of impending doom never leaves the screen. Crying babies, heavy shadows and broken records set a consistent tone of nightmarish anxiety. Drawn frenetically from the dancehall, where beautiful young couples bob and empty Champagne glasses litter the tables, to the apartment building of a former piano teacher that is stacked high with sheet music and out onto the empty cobblestone streets, the audience is never allowed to feel at ease.

The film is scored with discordant piano music and full of expressionist cinematography. At the beginning, the camera follows Dr. Braun through his work, where exaggerated shots lend themselves to symbolic interpretation. For example, in one scene, Dr. Braun stands silently in front of a wall full of ticking confiscated clocks. Clocks serve as a symbol for time; and the Jews who lost their clocks also had their time on Earth taken from them.

Later, short choppy shots of the doctor's home work act as exposition. A small pile of books and an empty jar of milk hint at poverty and intellect. His neglected violin suggests passion and creativity that has been suppressed; and his small bedroom window, which shows a solitary smoking chimney, subtly alludes to the horrors of the Holocaust.

Towards the end of the film, a voice from the radio, declares in a monotone voice, "The longer the war lasts the greater is our faith in the final victory." Not a voice of hope, Brynych's film sends out a message of despair.

Cast
 Miroslav Macháček as Dr. Armin Braun
 Olga Scheinpflugová as Music teacher
 Jiří Adamíra as Lawyer Karel Veselý, owner of the building
 Zdenka Procházková as Marta Veselá
 Josef Vinklář as Vlastimil Fanta
 Ilja Prachař as Butcher Šidlák
 Jana Prachařová as Věra Šidláková
 Jiří Vršťala as Inspector
 Tomáš Hádl as Honzík Veselý
 Eva Svobodová as Landlady Kratochvílová
 Karel Nováček as Resistance member Pánek
 Čestmír Řanda as Dr. Emil Wiener
 Slávka Budínová as Helena Wienerová
 Iva Janžurová as Maid Anička

Reception
When the film was released in the United States in 1968, it was praised by the critics. Time magazine said it was a "superlatively photographed film,"  and Roger Ebert wrote, "It comes as a shock, in the last ten minutes, to discover how deeply involved you have become. [It is] unmistakably the work of a master, and I can only wonder whether Brynych has made other films or if his ability is natural, as Fellini seems to be. I mention Fellini because this film seems to have what Fellini and very few other directors are able to achieve: A sense of rhythm." and "A nearly perfect film...beautiful, distinguished work. I imagine it will win the Academy Award for the best foreign film."

References

External links

DVD review at MovieHabit

1965 drama films
1965 films
1960s avant-garde and experimental films
Czechoslovak black-and-white films
1960s Czech-language films
Czechoslovak avant-garde and experimental films
Films about Jews and Judaism
Films directed by Zbyněk Brynych
Films set in Prague
Holocaust films
Czech war films
Czech resistance to Nazi occupation in film
Czech avant-garde and experimental films
Czech World War II films
Czechoslovak World War II films
Medical-themed films